Wanborough is a former settlement in Edwards County, Illinois, United States.

History
The community was named after a Wanborough in England. In the spring of 1826 Wanborough was the location of a short-lived socialist colony established upon the model of Robert Owen.

See also

 List of Owenite communities in the United States

Footnotes

Geography of Edwards County, Illinois
Ghost towns in Illinois